Adolphe Desbarrolles (22 August 1801 – 11 February 1886) was a French artist. He is considered the father of modern chiromancy, aka palmistry or palm reading, a form of divination.

Biography
Desbarolles was born in Paris, France. He died in Paris.

Works
"Les mystères de la main révélés et expliqués, art de connaître la vie, le caractère, les aptitudes et la destinée de chacun d'après la seule inspection des mains (chiromancie nouvelle)" (1860), Paris, Dentu, 624 p.

External links
Michon and the Birth of Scientific Graphology

References

1801 births
1886 deaths
Artists from Paris
Burials at Père Lachaise Cemetery
Divination
Palmists